Jane Tregunno (born July 9, 1962 in St. Catharines, Ontario) is a Canadian rower. She won a silver medal in the Coxed Fours event at the 1984 Summer Olympics. She also competed in the same event at the 1988 Summer Olympics, finishing in 7th place. She was selected as a member of the 1980 Summer Olympics however did not attend as a result of the 1980 Summer Olympics boycott.  Jane was also a part of the winning crew in the coxed fours event at the 1986 Commonwealth Games.

References

External links
 

1962 births
Living people
Canadian female rowers
Olympic rowers of Canada
Olympic silver medalists for Canada
Rowers at the 1984 Summer Olympics
Rowers at the 1988 Summer Olympics
Rowers from St. Catharines
Olympic medalists in rowing
Medalists at the 1984 Summer Olympics
Rowers at the 1986 Commonwealth Games
Commonwealth Games gold medallists for Canada
Commonwealth Games medallists in rowing
Medallists at the 1986 Commonwealth Games